Chirodectes is a very rare, monospecific genus of box jellyfish in the family Chirodropidae.

It was found within  of the surface, and the researchers who first described it speculated that it may have been relocated to  the area by Cyclone Justin.

There are no recorded cases of a human sting from Chirodectes as it "failed either to sting, or adhere to, the hand and forearm of an incautious volunteer" during the examination, but it is assumed – due to its relatively large size and to the extremely venomous nature of some chirodropids – that Chirodectes is itself venomous. A video of the Chirodectes was recorded underwater before it was collected. Four photos captured from the original 1997 video were published in the scholarly journal Memoirs of the Queensland Museum in 2005.

In 2022, a jellyfish was filmed by a scuba diver off the coast of Papua New Guinea, which prompted Lisa-ann Gershwin, the marine biologist who first described the genus Chirodectes, to examine the video.

Taxonomy 
Chirodectes was created in 2006 from C. maculatus, a species originally in the genus Chiropsalmus.

Species
The following species are in this genus:
Chirodectes maculatus (Cornelius, Fenner & Hore, 2005)

References

External links 
 
 

Chirodropidae

Medusozoa genera